Raven Chacon (born 1977) is a Diné-American composer, musician and artist. Born in Fort Defiance, Arizona within the Navajo Nation, Chacon became the first Native American to win a Pulitzer Prize for Music, for his Voiceless Mass in 2022.

He has also been a solo performer of noise music and worked with groups such as Postcommodity.

Life and career 

Raven Chacon was born in 1977 in Fort Defiance, Arizona, US within the Navajo Nation. He attended the University of New Mexico, where he obtained his BA in Fine Arts in 2001, then received an MFA in music composition from the California Institute of the Arts. He was a student of James Tenney, Morton Subotnick, Michael Pisaro and Wadada Leo Smith.

Chacon's visual and sonic artwork has been exhibited widely in the U.S. and abroad. His room-sized sound and text installation, Still Life, #3 (2015), was exhibited in the Transformer: Native Art in Light and Sound exhibition at the National Museum of the American Indian, New York. His collective and solo work has been presented at Sydney Biennale, Kennedy Center, the Whitney Biennial, documenta 14, Adelaide International, Vancouver Art Gallery, ASU Art Museum, Musée d'art contemporain de Montréal, the San Francisco Electronic Music Festival, the Heard Museum, Chaco Canyon, and Performance Today.

Chacon also performs in the groups KILT with Bob Bellerue, Mesa Ritual with William Fowler Collins, Endlings with John Dieterich, and collaborations with Laura Ortman. In 2016, he was commissioned by Kronos Quartet to compose a work for their Fifty For The Future project.

Chacon serves as Composer-in-Residence with the Native American Composers Apprenticeship Project. In 2012, he was awarded a Creative Capital Visual Arts grant. In 2014, he was honored with a Native Arts and Cultures Foundation National Artist Fellowship in Music. In 2018, Chacon was awarded the Berlin Prize by the American Academy in Berlin.

In 2022, Chacon became the first Native American to win the Pulitzer Prize for Music, which he received for his composition Voiceless Mass.

Postcommodity

Chacon was a member of the Native American art collective, Postcommodity, with whom he has developed multimedia installations which have been exhibited internationally. Other members include Cristóbal Martínez, Kade L. Twist, Steven Yazzie and Nathan Young. In 2017, as part of Postcommodity, Chacon created the multimedia project, ...in memoriam, in Edmonton in 2017, curated by Ociciwan Contemporary Art Collective.

Personal life 
Chacon lives in Albuquerque, New Mexico, and is married to Candice Hopkins, a Tagish curator. His sister Nani Chacon is a muralist.

Awards and honors
Chacon has received numerous awards and honors for his work, including the 2022 Pulitzer Prize for Music, an American Academy in Berlin Prize (music composition), a Creative Capital award (visual arts), a United States Artists fellowship (music), a Joan Mitchell Foundation fellowship, a Native Arts and Cultures Foundation artist fellowship, among others. Chacon received the inaugural Mellon Foundation Artist-in-Residence fellowship for the Colorado Springs Fine Arts Center at Colorado College.

Partial discography 
 Horse Notations (Cimiotti Recordings, 2020)
 Crisalide Fossile (w/ OvO) (Bronson, 2016)
 Your New Age Dream Contains More Blood Than You Can Imagine 12"LP (w/ Postcommodity) (Anarchymoon, 2011)
 Kitchen Sorcery (w/ Bob Bellerue) (Prison Tatt Records, 2011)
 At the Point Where the Rivers Crossed, We Drew Our Knives 12"LP (Anarchymoon, 2010)
 Black Streaked Hum (Lightning Speak/Featherspines, 2009)
 Overheard Songs (Innova, 2006)
 The Incredible 17000 km Split (split w/ Torturing Nurse) (8K Mob, 2006)
 Jesus Was a Wino (w/ Jeff Gburek) (Herbal Records, 2005)
 Still/life (Sicksicksick, 2004)
 Meet the Beatless (Sicksicksick, 2003)

References

External links
 
 Fellow Spotlight: Raven Chacon at the American Academy in Berlin
 2022 Pulitzer Prizes

1977 births
Living people
People from Fort Defiance, Arizona
Navajo artists
Navajo musicians
Native American composers
21st-century classical composers
California Institute of the Arts alumni
21st-century American composers
American male classical composers
American classical composers
21st-century American male musicians
20th-century Native Americans
21st-century Native Americans
Pulitzer Prize for Music winners